Chris Moleya (born 27 January 1997) is a South African athlete specialising in the high jump. He won a silver medal at the 2018 African Championships and a bronze at the 2015 African Games.

His personal best in the event is 2.27 metres set in Rheinau-Freistett (GER) in June 2019.

Competition record

References

1997 births
Living people
South African male high jumpers
Athletes (track and field) at the 2015 African Games
African Games bronze medalists for South Africa
African Games medalists in athletics (track and field)
21st-century South African people